The 42nd government of Turkey (5 January 1978 – 12 November 1979) was a coalition government of Republican People's Party (CHP) and some independents.

The elections
On the last day of 1977, the 41st government of Turkey came to an end because of vote of no confidence in the interpellation voting. The president asked Bülent Ecevit, the leader of CHP, to form a government. In addition to independents, two one-MP parties, namely Republican Reliance Party (CGP) and Democratic Party (DP), also supported him, and all supporters were given a seat in the government.

The government
In the list below, the serving period of cabinet members who served only a part of the cabinet's lifespan are shown in the column "Notes".

Aftermath
Senate elections and by-elections held on 14 October 1979 showed that CHP had lost ground to the opposition. Although the government still had the vote of confidence in the parliament, Ecevit resigned, but the government continued until the formation of the 43rd government.

References

Republican People's Party (Turkey) politicians
Cabinets of Turkey
1978 establishments in Turkey
1979 disestablishments in Turkey
Cabinets established in 1978
Cabinets disestablished in 1979
Coalition governments of Turkey
Members of the 42nd government of Turkey
16th parliament of Turkey
Republican People's Party (Turkey)